Elizabeth Stanley (born December 10, 1978) is an American stage actor and singer. She has originated a number of main and featured roles in Broadway musicals, including Allison in Cry-Baby and Dyanne in Million Dollar Quartet. In 2020, Stanley was nominated for a Tony Award for Best Actress in a Musical for her portrayal of Mary Jane Healy in Jagged Little Pill.

Career 

Stanley made her Broadway debut as April in the 2006 revival of Stephen Sondheim's Company. In 2008, she originated the role of Allison in Cry-Baby, a musical adaption of the film of the same name. The following year, she starred as Clio in the first national tour of Xanadu. In 2010, she originated the role of Dyanne in the Broadway production of Million Dollar Quartet.

In 2014, she played Claire de Loone in the Broadway revival of On the Town. For this role, she was nominated for a Drama Desk Award for Outstanding Featured Actress in a Musical. In 2015, she starred as Francesca in the national tour of The Bridges of Madison County.

Stanley originated the role of Mary Jane Healy in the American Repertory Theater production of Jagged Little Pill, a musical based on Alanis Morissette's album of the same name. For this role, she was nominated for an Independent Reviewers of New England (IRNE) Award and the Boston Theater Critics Association's Elliot Norton Award. In 2019, she reprised the role for the Broadway production. This role earned her nominations for the 2020 Drama Desk Award for Outstanding Actress in a Musical and the 2020 Tony Award for Best Actress in a Musical.

Personal life 
Stanley was born in Cedar Rapids and grew up in Denison, Iowa and Camp Point, Illinois. She attended Indiana University as a voice major.

She is engaged to Charlie Murphy. She announced that she was pregnant with their first child on April 10, 2021. Her daughter, Emilia Stanley Murphy was born August 19, 2021.

Theatre credits

Filmography

Television

Honors and awards 
{| class="wikitable"
!Year
!Work
!Award
!Category
!Result
|-
| 2014
| On the Town
| Drama Desk Award
| Outstanding Featured Actress in a Musical
| 
|-
| rowspan="2"|  2019
| rowspan="7"| Jagged Little Pill
| Elliot Norton Awards
| Outstanding Musical Performance by an Actress
| 
|-
| IRNE Awards
| Large Theatre: Best Actress in a Musical
| 
|-
| rowspan="4"|  2020
| Outer Critics Circle Award
| Outstanding Actress in a Musical
| 
|-
| Drama Desk Awards
| Outstanding Actress in a Musical
| 
|-
| Tony Award
| Best Actress in a Musical
| 
|-
| Grammy Awards
| Best Musical Theater Album
|

References

External links

Living people
Actors from Cedar Rapids, Iowa
Grammy Award winners
Indiana University alumni
People from Denison, Iowa
1978 births
American musical theatre actresses
American stage actresses
21st-century American actresses